The Spokane Public Library - East Side Branch is a historic building in East Central, Spokane, Washington. It was designed by architect Albert Held, and built in 1913 with a donation from Andrew Carnegie. It was used as a library until 1980. It has been listed on the National Register of Historic Places since August 3, 1982.

References

National Register of Historic Places in Spokane County, Washington
Libraries on the National Register of Historic Places in Washington (state)
Library buildings completed in 1913
Carnegie libraries in Washington (state)